Maria Àngels Cardona i Florit (1940, in Ferreries – 1991, in Barcelona) was a biologist, ecologist and botanist from Menorca, who worked mainly in Barcelona.

Biography
She lived during her early childhood in Ciutadella (Menorca) before moving to Barcelona to go to university.

She graduated in Biological Science in University of Barcelona on 1963. From 1964 to 1971 she completed her Doctoral thesis about the lifecycle of plants in different plants communities, basically around Collserola area, in Barcelona. With this thesis she started a new research line in geobotanics in Catalonia, which drove a significant change in scientific and methodology approaches. On 1972 she won the  Pius Font i Quer Prize of Institut d'Estudis Catalans.

Ever since the beginning of her doctoral thesis, she worked as professor in Barcelona University, and she was teaching in the Botanics Department from 1975 to 1985, when she moved to Autonomous University of Barcelona. On 1986 she won a full professor position on Vegetable Biology that she hold until her death.

She collaborated with different international professors, specially Juliette Contandriopoulos from University of Marseille an expert in Cytogenetics. She published more than fifty scientific papers and participated in the creation of Menorca Encyclopedia. She a member of National and International Societies and Commissions.

She had a poor health and died from a stroke in Barcelona on 24 December 1991.

References

Bibliography 
 Marti Llufriu, J. Manel (1999). M. Àngels Cardona i Florit: La flora i el paisatge de Menorca. Maó: Institut Menorquí d'Estudis.
 "Maria Àngels Cardona i Florit", Dones de ciència, calendari 2007. En internet: http://www20.gencat.cat/docs/icdones/Documents%20web%20antiga/Arxius/pub_calendari2007.pdf.

1940 births
1991 deaths
People from Menorca
20th-century Spanish botanists
Spanish ecologists
20th-century Spanish women scientists
Women ecologists
University of Barcelona alumni
Spanish women botanists